Sylvain Rajefiarison (born 5 December 1958) is a Malagasy boxer. He competed in the men's lightweight event at the 1980 Summer Olympics.

References

1958 births
Living people
Malagasy male boxers
Olympic boxers of Madagascar
Boxers at the 1980 Summer Olympics
Place of birth missing (living people)
Lightweight boxers